New Gisborne is a suburb of Gisborne in Victoria, Australia, in the foothills of Mount Macedon in the Shire of Macedon Ranges. The Gisborne railway station on the Bendigo line is located in New Gisborne, and a bus service connects residents of the two towns between the railway station and the Gisborne town centre. At the 2011 census, New Gisborne had a population of 2,380.

New Gisborne is serviced by a variety of community facilities, including a swim centre, netball courts and medical centre. The Baringo Food and Wine Co. is located in New Gisborne and operates a cafe and bistro, with plans for an arthouse cinema to open in 2015.

There are a number of preschools and primary schools in the area including The Gisborne Montessori School, Holy Cross Primary School and New Gisborne Primary School.

The New Gisborne post office opened on 1 September 1861, but closed down on 27 June 1994.

References

Towns in Victoria (Australia)
Shire of Macedon Ranges